Plus TV Africa  is a Nigerian pan-African news channel owned by General News and Entertainment Company and broadcast across Africa via the StarTimes dish platform, on DSTV Channel 408 from 3 April 2020, and on its YouTube channel. The TV station airs in over 30 countries with more than 12 million viewers across Africa.

References

External links
 Plus TV Africa Youtube Channel

Television stations in Nigeria
Television stations in Lagos
Companies based in Lagos
Television production companies of Nigeria